The 15th Special Forces Division is a division of the Syrian Armed Forces specializing in light infantry operations, based in the As-Suwayda Governorate, and headed by Major General Ghassan Al Yasmina.

Role
Syrians use the term 'Special Forces' to describe the 14th, 15th divisions, as well as the independent 'special forces' regiments, but they more closely resemble conventional light infantry units, than Western Special Forces in both mission and composition.

The term Special Forces has been applied ostensibly because of their specialized training in airborne and air assault
operations, but they should be regarded as light infantry forces and elite only in relation to the conventional armored and mechanized brigades of the Syrian Army.

History
Holliday wrote in 2013 that "the 15th Special Forces Division is a relatively recent formation, established between the mid-1990s restructuring of Ali Haidar’s former Special Forces Command" and the beginning of the Syrian Civil War.

Since it was founded, the division comprises four regiments under the leadership of Major General, Jihad Jaber, the commander of First Corps, and its leader, former Major General, Fuad Hamoudeh Brigadier General Esber Abboud, Brigadier General Ahmed Younis al Oukda commander of the 404th Tank Regiment, and Dean, Ahmed el Kousa 405 artillery commander of the regiment, and Brigadier Hassan Aizora commander of the regiment 44 special forces.

Syrian Civil War
Consistent reporting in mid-February 2012 showed that all three regiments of the 15th Special Forces Division had left their bases near the Jordanian border to join the fight in Homs.

The Syrian Government committed at least one Special Forces regiment to Idlib in 2011 and strongly reinforced the region with three additional Special Forces regiments, an armored brigade, and a detachment of 4th Armored Division troops by the spring of 2012. The 76th Armored Brigade and 41st Special Forces Regiment arrived in Idilb by late February 2012, establishing positions in the north and south of Idlib Governorate respectively. Two of the Special Forces regiments that participated in the February 2012 siege of Homs also moved to Idilb, namely, the 15th Division’s 35th Special Forces Regiment, which moved to Jisr al-Shughour, where it secured the key line of communication to coastal Latakia, and the 14th Division’s 556th Special Forces Regiment, which occupied positions south of Maarrat al-Nu'man. Elements of the 4th Armored Division also moved to northern Syria after the siege of Homs, but it is unclear how long those elite forces remained. Most of the Division’s reported activity in the north took place that spring, and it is difficult to see whether activity or reporting tapered off.

In mid-March 2012, troops from the 4th Armored Division, 76th Armored Brigade, and 35th Special Forces Regiment quickly cleared rebels out of Idlib city, but pushed rebels into the surrounding countryside in the process. The operation represented a relatively modest force commitment. Imagery released by the U.S. State Department showed between thirty and thirty-five armored vehicles encircling Idilb in the operation, which represents far less than one brigade’s worth of vehicles according to Syrian Army doctrine.

Loyalty to the government 
Human Rights Watch and Washington Institute reports seem to confirm the existence of the 15th Special Forces Division, which appears to have remained steadfastly loyal to the government.

See also
14th Special Forces Division
Al-Assad family
4th Armored Division
Republican Guard

References

External links
Washington Institute, 
Human Rights Watch, Structure and Command of Armed Forces and Intelligence Agencies, 16 December 2011
Joseph Holliday, "The Assad Regime: From Counterinsurgency to Civil War", Institute for the Study of War, March 2013. Seemingly the best concise description and analysis of the Syrian Army and its involvement in the current Syrian Civil War.

Divisions of Syria
As-Suwayda Governorate
Military units and formations established in the 1990s